ApprenNet is a Philadelphia-based educational technology startup company founded in 2011 by Emily Foote and Drexel University School of Law Professor Karl Okamoto. The company provides apprenticeship-like job experiences online.

AppreNet's first release was LawMeets, an online experience similar to a moot court competition.  With LawMeets, students enact their response to a legal problem, and can not only then review their own performance, but also receive feedback, including critiques by experts.  According to the Journal of the American Bar Association, LawMeets "quickly [became] a very big deal."

ApprenNet next added K12Meets, a program enabling teachers to practice their classroom techniques, and created a training program for employees at a Philadelphia restaurant.

In 2013, ApprenNet was one of five startup companies selected to participate in the University of Pennsylvania's  Education Design Studio Inc. (EDSi), an innovation incubator dedicated to funding and launching education technology companies.

Grants 

In 2012, the National Science Foundation awarded Okamoto a $500,000 grant to expand LawMeets' approach to learning in other disciplines.  Okamoto told an interviewer that ApprenNet technology could be applied to many fields, not only training teachers and restaurant employees, but even musical training. "We'll take care of law first," said Okamoto, "and then use it in lots of different places. Why can't we crowdsource violin?"

By 2015, after ApprenNet hired Columbia Business School graduate Rachel Jacobs as CEO, the start-up had received more than a million dollars in Small Business Innovation Research grants. Jacobs was hired to lead ApprenNet in an expansion from its original focus on educating lawyers to applying its online teaching technology in training health care professionals, college level instructors, and K-12 teachers.

Merger

Following Jacobs's death in May 2015, ApprenNet merged with Handsfree Learning of California.

In June 2016, ApprenNet changed its name to Practice and announced a $4 million Series A fundraising round.

References

Educational technology companies of the United States
Privately held companies of the United States
Companies based in Philadelphia